Sewa Sadan English Boarding School is a boarding school located in Battisputali, Kathmandu, Nepal. It is an English co-educational school established in 1994.

References

http://www.nepalyp.com/company/32606/Sewa_Sadan_English_Boarding_School
https://www.merosewa.com/listings/sewa-sadan-english-boarding-school/

Boarding schools in Nepal
Schools in Kathmandu
1994 establishments in Nepal